"The Rocking-Horse Winner" is a short story by D. H. Lawrence. It was first published in July 1926, in Harper's Bazaar and subsequently appeared in the first volume of Lawrence's collected short stories. It was made into a full-length film directed by Anthony Pelissier and starring John Howard Davies, Valerie Hobson and John Mills; the film was released in the United Kingdom in 1949 and in 1950 in the United States.  It was also made into a TV film in 1977 and a 1997 film directed by Michael Almereyda.

Plot summary
The story describes a young middle-class Englishwoman who "had no luck". Though outwardly successful, she is haunted by a sense of failure; her husband is a ne'er-do-well and her work as a commercial artist does not earn as much as she would like. The family's life exceeds its income and unspoken anxiety about money permeates the household. Her children, a son Paul and his two sisters, sense this anxiety; they even claim they can hear the house whispering "There must be more money".

Paul tells his Uncle Oscar Cresswell about betting on horse races with Bassett, the gardener. He has been placing bets using his pocket money and has won and saved three hundred and twenty pounds. Sometimes he says he is "sure" of a winner for an upcoming race and the horses he names do in fact win, sometimes at remarkable odds. Uncle Oscar and Bassett both place large bets on the horses Paul names.

After more winnings, Paul and Oscar arrange to give the mother a gift of five thousand pounds but the gift only lets her spend more. Disappointed, Paul tries harder than ever to be "lucky". As the Derby approaches, Paul is determined to learn the winner. Concerned about his health, his mother rushes home from a party and discovers his secret. He has been spending hours riding his rocking horse, sometimes all night long, until he "gets there", into a clairvoyant state where he can be sure of the winner's name.

Paul remains ill through the day of the Derby. Informed by Cresswell, Bassett has placed Paul's bet on Malabar, at fourteen to one. When he is informed by Bassett that he now has 80,000 pounds, Paul, excited, tells his mother how "lucky" he is. Unfortunately, Paul died the next night.

Characters
Paul: A young boy who notices that his mother doesn't love him and his sisters, even though she "adores" them. When he receives a rocking horse for Christmas, he rides it often and comes to find that he can predict what horse is going to win the next big horse race.

Hester: Paul's mother. She becomes "dissatisfied with her marriage" when she finds that her husband is not lucky and doesn't make enough money.

Bassett: The family gardener and friend. Is the one who gets Paul into horse racing and later becomes "betting partners".

Oscar Creswell: Paul's uncle and his mother's brother. Provided the money that Paul used to make his first win at the horse race. Signed the lawyer papers for Paul's mother to receive "one thousand pounds at a time, on the mother's birthday, for the next five years". Oscar becomes partners with Paul and Bassett.

Themes 
Lawrence suggests through his story that materialism and love cannot coexist. Hester pressures Paul to satisfy her materialistic desires. By demonstrating the lack of love in materialism, Lawrence suggests that external sources like money and luck cannot bring one happiness; instead, happiness must come from within. The juxtaposition of Hester's greed with Paul's generosity highlights the dichotomy between materialism and love.

Standard edition 
 The Woman who Rode Away and Other Stories (1928) edited by Dieter Mehl and Christa Jansohn, Cambridge University Press, 1995, pp. 230–243,

References

 Foster, Thomas C. How To Read Literature Like A Professor
 "The Rocking-horse Winner." Magill Book Reviews (1990): Academic Search Premier. EBSCO. Web. 24 Oct. 2011

External links 
 Full text of "The Rocking-Horse Winner" on The Short Story Project

Short stories by D. H. Lawrence
1926 short stories
Works originally published in Harper's Bazaar
Short stories adapted into films